NMR, or nuclear magnetic resonance, is a phenomenon in which nuclei in a magnetic field absorb and re-emit electromagnetic radiation.

NMR may also refer to:

Applications of nuclear magnetic resonance
 Nuclear magnetic resonance spectroscopy
 Solid-state nuclear magnetic resonance
 Protein nuclear magnetic resonance spectroscopy
 Proton nuclear magnetic resonance
 Carbon-13 nuclear magnetic resonance
 Magnetic resonance imaging, using NMR for non-invasive imaging
 Surface nuclear magnetic resonance, geophysical technique based on NMR
 Benchtop nuclear magnetic resonance spectrometer

History and culture
 National Military Council (Suriname), Suriname's military junta in the 1980s 
 Natal Mounted Rifles, a South African army regiment
 National Monuments Record, now the Historic England Archive
 Nilgiri Mountain Railway, Tamil Nadu, India

Politics
 NMR, Swedish initials for Nordic Resistance Movement, pan-Nordic neo-Nazi movement

Entertainment media
 Nielsen Media Research, a US TV ratings company
 NewMediaRockstars, a news website